Beach water polo at the 2010 Asian Beach Games was held from 8 December to 12 December 2010 in Muscat, Oman. Kazakhstan won the gold medal in a round robin competition, Kuwait finished 2nd and Saudi Arabia finished 3rd and won the bronze medal over Syria and Indonesia.

Medalists

Results

References

External links
 Official site

2010 Asian Beach Games events
Asian Beach Games
2010